Coalisland is a small town in County Tyrone, Northern Ireland, with a population of 5,682 in the 2011 Census. Four miles from Lough Neagh, it was formerly a centre for coal mining.

History

Origins
In the late 17th century, coal deposits were discovered in East Tyrone. While it was possible to exploit these resources, the difficulty was in getting the coal to market in Dublin. In 1744 work began on the Coalisland Canal linking the coalfields to Lough Neagh. The town grew up around the canal workings.

Twentieth century
On 24 August 1968, the Campaign for Social Justice (CSJ), the Northern Ireland Civil Rights Association (NICRA), among others, held the first civil rights march in Northern Ireland. The march went from Coalisland to Dungannon.

The Troubles 

The town has traditionally been viewed as an IRA stronghold throughout the twentieth century, with deep and enduring links to republicanism in the vicinity. From 1969 to 2001, a total of 20 people were shot in or near Coalisland during the Troubles. The British Army killed a total of eight people, seven of whom were Provisional Irish Republican Army members and one a Catholic civilian; the IRA killed five British soldiers, three Royal Ulster Constabulary policemen, one ex-Ulster Defence Regiment soldier, and two Catholic civilians, all in separate incidents. The Ulster Volunteer Force was responsible for the murder of a Catholic civilian in the nearby town of Aughamullan.

Transport
The town was served by a canal (the Coalisland Canal or Tyrone Navigation), although this is now derelict. A campaign for its restoration is underway.

Coalisland railway station was opened on 28 July 1897, closed for passenger traffic on 16 January 1956 and for goods traffic on 5 October 1959, finally closing altogether on 1 April 1965. There are no remains of the railway other than the bridge on the Derry Road, an old goods shed, and grown-over platforms.

Daily bus services operated by Ulsterbus go through the town.

Arts and culture
The Craic Theatre and Arts Centre is a performing arts venue built on the site of an old weaving factory. Each year it provides opportunities and entertainment for people of the area, through its in-house company Craic Players. It has a youth theatre programme for children and young people aged 4–18. It also offers professional touring companies the opportunity to stage shows, concerts and workshops.

Education
Gaelscoil Uí Néill
Primate Dixon Primary School
St John's Primary School
St Joseph's College

Sport
Coalisland Na Fianna is the local Gaelic Athletic Association club.

Demography

19th century population
The population of the village increased during the 19th century:

Census 2011
On Census day (27 March 2011) there were 5,682 people living in Coalisland. Of these:
25.5% were aged under 16 years and 10.0% were aged 65 and over
49.1% of the population were male and 50.9% were female
93.8% were from a Catholic background and 4.7% were from a Protestant or other Christian background
7.2% of people aged 16–74 were unemployed.

People
 Denis Haughey (b. 1944) – politician, founding member of SDLP
 Dennis Taylor (b. 1949) – 1985 Snooker World Champion
 Michelle O'Neill (b. 1977) – Sinn Féin politician
 Nathan Rafferty (b. 2000) Professional PDC darts player

See also
 List of localities in Northern Ireland by population

References

 
Towns in County Tyrone